Ihor Uhnich (born May 4, 1985) is a Ukrainian karateka competing in the kumite 75 kg division. He is 2017 and 2018 European Team Championships medalist.

References

External links
 Ukrainian Karate Federation: Ryzvan Talibov

1985 births
Living people
Ukrainian male karateka